The 2001 European Cup took place on 23 and 24 June 2001 in Bremen, Germany. The B finals were held in Vaasa, Finland and Budapest, Hungary.

Poland won the men's Super League title while Russia won the women's title.

Super League

Held on 23 and 24 June in Bremen, Germany

Team standings

Results summary

Men's events

Women's events

First League
The First League was held on 23 and 24 June

Men

Group A
Held in Vaasa, Finland

Group B
Held in Budapest, Hungary

Women

Group A
Held in Vaasa, Finland

Group B
Held in Budapest, Hungary

Second League
The Second League was held on 23 and 24 June

Men

Group A
Held in Riga, Latvia

Group B
Held in Nicosia, Cyprus

Women

Group A
Held in Riga, Latvia

Group B
Held in Nicosia, Cyprus

References

External links
European Cup results (Men) from GBR Athletics
European Cup results (Women) from GBR Athletics

European Cup (athletics)
European Cup
Sport in Vaasa
International athletics competitions hosted by Finland
International athletics competitions hosted by Germany
Sport in Bremen (city)
International athletics competitions hosted by Hungary
2001 in Finnish sport
2001 in German sport
2001 in Hungarian sport